Sharda English Secondary School (SESS) is located at the center of Kathauna Bazar, Shambhunath Municipality, Saptari District, Nepal. It was established in 1995 AD. The founders of this school are Mr. Nenu Lal Chaudhary and Mrs. Sharmila Yonjan Chaudhary.

The Motto of Sharda is to provide proper education to every children of this locality

SESS is first English school established in Kathauna.

Staff 
 Administrator: Mr. Satya Narayan Chaudhary

Infrastructure
This school has good built-up buildings with sufficient classrooms.

Sports and co-curricular activities
The school encourages co-curricular activities and holds at least one competition each month..

References

External links

Schools in Nepal
1995 establishments in Nepal